This is a list of notable Iraqi Assyrians.

Iraqi Assyrians are those Assyrians still residing in the country of Iraq, and those in the Assyrian diaspora who are of Iraqi-Assyrian heritage.

List

Arts
Hanna Petros
Alfred Rasho

Business
Nadhmi Auchi

Literature
Sargon Boulus
Dunya Mikhail
Samuel Shimon

Politics
Yusuf Salman Yusuf
Yonadam Kanna
Tariq Aziz
Gurgis Shlaymun
Pascal Esho Warda

Religion
Eliya Abuna
Gewargis III
Raphael I Bidawid
Eliya Abulyonan
Ignatius Aphrem I Barsoum
Ragheed Ganni
George Garmo
Timothaus Shallita
Yohannan VIII Hormizd
Louis Raphael I Sako

Sports
Ammo Baba
Douglas Aziz
Youra Eshaya
Ayoub Odisho
Basil Gorgis
Saad Benyamin
Justin Meram
Rebin Sulaka
Mario Shabow
Saadi Toma
Thamer Yousif
Aram Karam
Saeed Easho
Edison David

Others
Hormuzd Rassam
Donny George Youkhanna
Alphonse Mingana
Toma Tomas
Margaret George Shello
Kamel Hana Gegeo

Iraqi Assyrian people